In universal algebra and lattice theory, a tolerance relation on an algebraic structure is a reflexive symmetric relation that is compatible with all operations of the structure. Thus a tolerance is like a congruence, except that the assumption of transitivity is dropped. On a set, an algebraic structure with empty family of operations, tolerance relations are simply reflexive symmetric relations. A set that possesses a tolerance relation can be described as a tolerance space. Tolerance relations provide a convenient general tool for studying indiscernibility/indistinguishability phenomena. The importance of those for mathematics had been first recognized by Poincaré.

Definitions 
A tolerance relation can also be seen as a cover of  that satisfies certain conditions. The two definitions are equivalent, since for a fixed algebraic structure, the tolerance relations in the two definitions are in one-to-one correspondence. The tolerance relations on an algebraic structure  form an algebraic lattice  under inclusion.

As binary relations 
A tolerance relation on an algebraic structure  is a binary relation  on  that satisfies the following conditions.
 (Reflexivity)  for all 
 (Symmetry) if  then  for all 
That is, the set  is a subalgebra of the direct product  of two . 
A congruence relation is a tolerance relation that is also transitive.

As covers 
A tolerance relation on an algebraic structure  is a cover  of  that satisfies the following three conditions.
(To see this, take .)
(Such a  need not be unique.)
Every partition of  satisfies the first two conditions, but not conversely. A congruence relation is a tolerance relation that also forms a set partition.

Equivalence of the two definitions 
Let  be a tolerance binary relation on an algebraic structure . Let  be the family of maximal subsets  such that  for every . Using graph theoretical terms,  is the set of all maximal cliques of the graph . If  is a congruence relation,  is just the quotient set of equivalence classes. (The last condition is shown using Zorn's lemma.) Therefore, the two definitions are equivalent. A tolerance is transitive as a binary relation if and only if it is a partition as a cover. Thus the two characterizations of congruence relations also agree.

Quotient algebras over tolerance relations 

Then this provides a natural definition of the quotient algebra

In the case of congruence relations, the uniqueness condition always holds true and the quotient algebra defined here coincides with the usual one.

A main difference from congruence relations is that for a tolerance relation the uniqueness condition may fail, and even if it does not, the quotient algebra may not inherit the identities defining the variety that  belongs to, so that the quotient algebra may fail to be a member of the variety again. Therefore, for a variety  of algebraic structures, we may consider the following two conditions.
Every strongly tolerance factorable variety is tolerance factorable, but not vice versa.

Examples

Sets 
A set is an algebraic structure with no operations at all. In this case, tolerance relations are simply reflexive symmetric relations and it is trivial that the variety of sets is strongly tolerance factorable.

Groups 
On a group, every tolerance relation is a congruence relation. In particular, this is true for all algebraic structures that are groups when some of their operations are forgot, e.g. rings, vector spaces, modules, Boolean algebras, etc. Therefore, the varieties of groups, rings, vector spaces, modules and Boolean algebras are also strongly tolerance factorable trivially.

Lattices 
Thus, for all , we have

In particular, the following results hold.
  if and only if .

The variety of lattices is strongly tolerance factorable.

and the quotient algebra

is a lattice again.

In particular, we can form quotient lattices of distributive lattices and modular lattices over tolerance relations. However, unlike in the case of congruence relations, the quotient lattices need not be distributive or modular again. In other words, the varieties of distributive lattices and modular lattices are tolerance factorable, but not strongly tolerance factorable. Actually, every subvariety of the variety of lattices is tolerance factorable, and the only strongly tolerance factorable subvariety other than itself is the trivial subvariety (consisting of one-element lattices). This is because every lattice is isomorphic to a sublattice of the quotient lattice over a tolerance relation of a sublattice of a direct product of two-element lattices.

See also 
Dependency relation
Quasitransitive relation—a generalization to formalize indifference in social choice theory
Rough set

References

Further reading
Gerasin, S. N., Shlyakhov, V. V., and Yakovlev, S. V. 2008. Set coverings and tolerance relations. Cybernetics and Sys. Anal. 44, 3 (May 2008), 333–340. 
Hryniewiecki, K. 1991, Relations of Tolerance, FORMALIZED MATHEMATICS, Vol. 2, No. 1, January–February  1991.

Universal algebra
Lattice theory
Reflexive relations
Symmetric relations
Approximations